Randy Bennett (born 1962) is an American basketball coach.

Randy Bennett may also refer to:

Randy Bennett (swimming coach) (1963–2015), Canadian swimming coach
Randy Elliot Bennett (born 1952), American researcher